Cleospira is a genus of sea snails, marine gastropod mollusks in the family Pseudomelatomidae, the turrids and allies.

Species
 Cleospira ochsneri (Hertlein & A. M. Strong, 1949)
Species brought into synonymy
 Cleospira bicolor (Sowerby I, 1834): synonym of Cleospira ochsneri (Hertlein & A. M. Strong, 1949)

References

External links
 
 Bouchet, P.; Kantor, Y. I.; Sysoev, A.; Puillandre, N. (2011). A new operational classification of the Conoidea (Gastropoda). Journal of Molluscan Studies. 77(3): 273-308
 McLean, J.H. (1971) A revised classification of the family Turridae, with the proposal of new subfamilies, genera, and subgenera from the Eastern Pacific. The Veliger, 14, 114–130

 
Gastropods described in 1971
Gastropod genera